Lost and Won is a 1915 British silent drama film directed by Laurence Trimble and starring Florence Turner, Henry Edwards and Edward Lingard.

Cast
 Florence Turner as Barbar Weston  
 Henry Edwards as Dick Barry  
  Edward Lingard as Howard Lyston  
 Herbert Dunsey as Mr. Weston  
 James Lindsay 
 Minnie Rayner
 Jean, a dog

References

Bibliography
 Low, Rachael. History of the British Film, 1914-1918. Routledge, 2005.

External links
 Lost and Won at the British Film Institute's Film and TV Database
 

1915 films
1915 drama films
British drama films
1910s English-language films
Films directed by Laurence Trimble
British silent feature films
Films set in England
British black-and-white films
1910s British films
Silent drama films